Gregory James Venables (born 6 December 1949) is an English Anglican bishop. He has served as the Primate of the Southern Cone in South America from 2001 until 2010, and once again since 2016 until 2020. He is the former diocesan bishop of Argentina since November 2020.

Early life
Venables was educated at Chatham House Grammar School, Kingston University and Christ Church University College Canterbury, after which he was successively a computer systems officer and a school teacher.

Ecclesiastical career
Venables was ordained as a deacon in 1984 and eight months later as priest. He started his ordained ministry, serving with the Anglican Church in Paraguay, Bolivia and Argentina. He was headmaster of St Andrew's College, Asuncion, Paraguay, from 1978 until 1989.

He was ordained to the episcopate in 1993 and returned to South America as Assistant Bishop of Peru and Bolivia, being consecrated the first Bishop of Bolivia in 1995.

Venables was elected Archbishop of South America for the first time in 2001, serving until 2010. He became a significant leader of the Anglican realignment during his tenure. He was once again elected at the provincial synod held in Santiago, Chile on 7–10 November 2016

Venables is an honorary Fellow of Canterbury Christ Church University.  He is also the Patron of the Federation of Anglican Churches in the Americas.

Venables has been married to Sylvia Margaret (née Norton) since 1970 and they have one son, two daughters and eight grandchildren.

References

|-

|-

1949 births
Alumni of Kingston University
21st-century Anglican archbishops
English expatriates in Argentina
English Anglicans
Fellows of Canterbury Christ Church University
Living people
Alumni of Canterbury Christ Church University
Anglican bishops of Bolivia
Anglican bishops of Argentina
Anglican realignment people